Antonio Llardén Carratalá (born 1951, Barcelona, Spain) is Executive Chairman of Enagás, the main carrier of natural gas in Spain and the Technical Manager of the Spanish Gas System. The company has presence in México, Chile and Perú, and participates in the European project Trans Adriatic Pipeline. It is also certified as independent TSO European Union, which homologates the company to gas transmission network operators of other European countries.

Biography 

Antonio Llardén Carratalá was born in Barcelona, Spain, in 1951. He has a master's degree in Industrial Engineering from the Polytechnic University of Catalonia and he passed the public examinations and entered into the Superior Corps of State Functionaries.

Llardén has wide-ranging experience in the business world. He started his career in the consulting sector, in Ingenieros Consultores S.A. Over the course of his professional life, he has held different positions of great responsibility, especially in the infrastructure and energy sectors. He is married with one son.

Career 

Currently, Antonio Llardén is Enagás’ Executive Chairman. In addition, he is a Member of the Board of Directors and the Executive Board of the Spanish Energy Club and Chairman of the Sustainable Energy and Environmental Foundation (Funseam), comprising the leading companies in the Spanish energy sector. He is a member of the CEOE Business Action Council as well.

He is a sponsor of the Real Instituto Elcano de Estudios Internacionales y Estratégicos and a member of the Business Leadership Forum. He also sponsors the Escuela Superior de Música Reina Sofía and is a member of the Board of Protectores del Teatro Real and of its Monitoring Committee.

Antonio Llardén spent most of his career in the Gas Natural-Repsol Group, holding various senior executive positions, among others, Chief Executive Officer of the Company created by Repsol and Gas Natural (Gas Natural Latinoamericana) and Chief Corporate Officer of Gas Natural Group.

From 2001 to 2007, Llardén was Chairman of the Board of Directors of Sedigas, an association comprising companies related to the gas sector in Spain. During this period, he was also a member of the Board of Directors of Eurogas and the Executive Committee of the International Gas Union (IGU).

Antonio Llardén brought forward a 4,000 million euros investment plan that was set to be realised between 2007-2012, in order to increase the gas pipeline network and expand the plants in Barcelona, Huelva and Cartagena.
 
In this context, he was a member of Policy Advisory Network of International Chamber of Commerce (ICC) and was part of its Commission on Environment and Energy. In addition, he was a member of High Level Group on the South West Regional Energy Market of the European Commission.

Llardén was the Dean of the College of Engineers, as well as a member of the Social Council of the Autonomous University of Barcelona and Chairman of its Economics Committee.

Also, he was a member of the board of directors of Instituto Nacional de Industria, Instituto de Crédito Oficial (ICO), Telefónica, Enresa and Caixa Catalunya. In 1992, he took part of Barcelona Olympic Games as well.

Antonio Llardén also regularly gives Master Lectures for postgraduates at Universities and Business Schools, like IESE Business School, IE Business School, ESADE or University of Deusto

References

"Antonio Llardén: el ingeniero de Serra", El Economista
"Antoni Llardén, nuevo presidente de Enagás", El Mundo
"Entrevista a Antonio Llardén", CEDE

External links 
 
 

1951 births
Living people
Spanish chief executives
Polytechnic University of Catalonia alumni